is a Japanese talent, gravure idol and actress. She was born on May 31, 1980 in Ehime Prefecture, Japan.

Personal life
On June 26, 2015, it was announced that Manabe married rock musician Kazuya Yoshii and was pregnant with his child and due to give birth in the fall. Their marriage certificate was submitted in September and Kaori gave birth on October 20, 2015. She first met Yoshii, who is fourteen years her senior, in autumn 2011 and has been a fan of his band The Yellow Monkey since middle school.

Works
Her television roles have included the following.
 Science Zero (NHK)
 Waku Waku (Chukyo TV)
 Water Boys
 Ultraman R/B as Mio Minato

References

External links

 Agency profile 
 Official blog 
 

1980 births
Living people
People from Saijō, Ehime
Japanese gravure idols
Japanese actresses
Japanese bloggers
Japanese television personalities
Yokohama National University alumni
Japanese women bloggers